Harald Steen (April 2, 1886 – April 18, 1941) was a Norwegian tenor and actor.

Steen debuted at the National Theater in Oslo in 1902 and remained there until 1908. He was engaged with the Central Theater from 1908 to 1927. With his spirited mood, smooth characterization, and excellent voice, he was a key actor for much of the theater's repertoire of comedies, operettas, and operas. He made his film debut in 1916 in the Danish silent film Strandvaskeren. Harald Steen was married to the actress Signe Heide Steen, and he was the father of Randi Heide Steen, Harald Heide Steen, and Kari Diesen.

Filmography
 1916: Strandvaskeren as Hans the fisherman
 1927: Den glade enke i Trangvik as Jørnsen, the shipowner
 1928: Cafe X as Pålsen, the cafe owner
 1937: Bra mennesker as Haakonsen
 1938: Det drønner gjennom dalen as the doctor
 1939: Familien på Borgan as Borgan, the wholesaler
 1939: De vergeløse as the sailor
 1940: Tørres Snørtevold as Viberg
 1941: Gullfjellet as the bank official in Hamar
 1941: Hansen og Hansen as the chauffeur

References

20th-century Norwegian male actors
20th-century Norwegian male singers
20th-century Norwegian singers
Male actors from Oslo
1886 births
1941 deaths